Andrew Ross (born 8 November 1904) was a Scottish rugby union player who played international rugby for Scotland and the British Lions.

He played as hooker for Kilmarnock RFC and was capped for Scotland.

He toured with the 1924 British Lions tour to South Africa, playing in matches against Western Province, Western Province Universities and Rhodesia.

References

1904 births
Scottish rugby union players
Scotland international rugby union players
British & Irish Lions rugby union players from Scotland
Rugby union hookers
Year of death missing